Pleurozium schreberi, the red-stemmed feathermoss or Schreber's big red stem moss, is a moss with a loose growth pattern. The root name pleuro comes from the Latin for ribs, possibly describing how the parts branch from the stem.

The species occurs on the floor of the boreal forests of Canada, Scandinavia and northern Russia; an example of this occurrence is within the black spruce/feathermoss climax forest, sometimes having moderately dense overstory canopy and featuring a forest floor of feathermosses including, Hylocomium splendens and Ptilium crista-castrensis.

In a study of the effect of the herbicide Asulam on moss growth, Pleurozium schreberi was shown to have intermediate sensitivity to Asulam exposure.

Gallery

References

External links 

 rook.org
 borealforest.org

Hypnales